Paropakar Maternity and Women's Hospital, also known as Prasuti Griha, is the first maternity hospital of Nepal. It is located on Maternity Hospital Road, in Thapathali, Kathmandu, Nepal. The hospital was established on 17 August 1959 and has 415 beds. About 15,000 women deliver their babies in this hospital annually.

History
The hospital was started by Paropakar Sansthan, a non-governmental organization at the initiative of Daya Bir Singh Kansakar in the ground of Charburja Palace. The hospital was named by  the late King Mahendra (then the Crown Prince) as 'Paropakar Shree Panch Indra Rajya Lakshmi Maternity Hospital' in memory of late Indra Rajya Lakshmi Devi Shah (then Crown Princess), who died after her last pregnancy. In 2 December 2007, the hospital was renamed as Paropakar Maternity &  Women's Hospital.

Facilities
The hospital has 415 beds, of which 336 are allocated to inpatient care; 241 beds are dedicated for obstetrics, 61 for gynaecology and 34 for neonatology, while 79 are service beds.

The hospital employs approximately 50 doctors, 170 nurses, 40 paramedical staff, and 360 administrative, support and other staff. Residential facilities are available for doctors and nurses working in the hospital, and in addition there is a hostel for duty doctors and residents.

The hospital provides the following services:
Obstetrics and gynaecology
Neonatology
Radiology
Pathology

Notable people born in this hospital
 Jigme Khesar Namgyel Wangchuck, the current king of Bhutan
 Two daughters of Princess Shruti of Nepal
Yogeshwar Amatya
Nalina Chitrakar

External links
  Official website

References

Hospitals in Nepal
Women's hospitals
1959 establishments in Nepal
Maternity hospitals
Women in Nepal